Ann or Anne Kelly  may refer to:
Ann Davidson Kelly (1912–1989), British medical social worker
Ann Wood-Kelly (1918–2006), American pilot
Jo Ann Kelly (1944–1990), English musician
De-Anne Kelly (born 1954), Australian politician

See also